Ahmet Aras (born 13 December 1987) is a Turkish professional footballer who plays as a forward for 1928 Bucaspor.

References

External links
 

1987 births
Living people
Turkish footballers
Muğlaspor footballers
İstanbulspor footballers
İzmirspor footballers
Pendikspor footballers
Bucaspor footballers
Ankara Demirspor footballers
İnegölspor footballers
Sivasspor footballers
Fethiyespor footballers
Antalyaspor footballers
Şanlıurfaspor footballers
Yeni Malatyaspor footballers
Elazığspor footballers
Fatih Karagümrük S.K. footballers
Süper Lig players
People from Kızıltepe
TFF First League players
Association football midfielders